Elmadi Zaynaydiyevich Zhabrailov (born 6 September 1965) is a Russian freestyle wrestler of Chechen origin, who competed for the Soviet Union and then Kazakhstan. His elder brother Lukman prepared him for the 1992 Olympics, where Elmadi won a silver medal, losing the final bout to Kevin Jackson. At the next Olympics the brothers competed against each other, and Elmadi won, but placed only sixth overall.

Outside Olympics, Zhabrailov won the word middleweight title in 1989, placing second in 1995, the European title in 1991, and the Asian title in 1995. After retiring from competitions he headed the federal state institution Minmeliovodhoz in Dagestan, Russia.

References

1965 births
Living people
People from Khasavyurt
Soviet male sport wrestlers
Olympic wrestlers of the Unified Team
Olympic wrestlers of Kazakhstan
Wrestlers at the 1992 Summer Olympics
Wrestlers at the 1996 Summer Olympics
Kazakhstani male sport wrestlers
Olympic silver medalists for the Unified Team
Olympic medalists in wrestling
Chechen martial artists
Dynamo sports society athletes
Wrestlers at the 1994 Asian Games
World Wrestling Championships medalists
Medalists at the 1992 Summer Olympics
Medalists at the 1994 Asian Games
Asian Games silver medalists for Kazakhstan
Asian Games medalists in wrestling
European Wrestling Championships medalists